Icelandair Group hf. is an Icelandic travel industry corporation, the owner and holding company of the airline Icelandair and several other travel industry companies in Iceland. The group's headquarters are at Reykjavík Airport in Reykjavík. The corporation is the largest in Iceland, with 125 billion ISK in revenue in 2013.

Operations 
Icelandair Group focuses on the international airline and tourism sectors, with Iceland as the cornerstone of its international route network. The business concept of the group is built exclusively on Icelandair's route network and on marketing Iceland as a year-round destination.

During 2013 the group employed an average of 2,850 full-time employees. 1,387 of those were employed by Icelandair. The number of employees had been rising steadily from 2,028 in 2010.

Icelandair Group is the parent company of nine subsidiaries that form the two business segments of Route Network and Tourism Services. In addition to passenger flights operated by Icelandair, the group has vast interests in most aspects of Icelandic tourism and aviation, including hotel chains, travel agencies, domestic airlines and cargo, support services, as well as fledgling ACMI and lease operations.

History 

Icelandair Group traces its roots to 1937 when the airline Flugfélag Akureyrar, was founded at Akureyri on the north coast of Iceland. In 1943 the company moved its headquarters to the capital Reykjavík and changed its name to Air Iceland, which later assumed the international trade name Icelandair.

In 1944 another Icelandic airline was founded, Loftleiðir, by three young pilots returning from flight training in Canada. Initially, both companies concentrated on Icelandic domestic air services but then began international flights between Iceland and other countries. In 1953 Loftleiðir pioneered low-fare services across the North Atlantic and became quite successful for the greater part of two decades.

In 1973, however, it was agreed to merge both Air Iceland and Loftleiðir under a new holding company, Flugleiðir. In October 1979 Flugleiðir assumed all operating responsibilities of its two parents and decided to use Icelandair as its international trade name, retaining the Flugleiðir name for the Icelandic domestic market.

In January 2003 Flugleiðir became a holding company with 11 subsidiaries in the travel and tourist industry in Iceland with Icelandair being the largest subsidiary. In 2005 the name Flugleiðir was changed to FL Group which would concentrate on investment, while Icelandair continued its flight operations under the aegis of a separate company, Icelandair Group. The board of directors of FL Group announced in February 2006 its intention to list Icelandair Group on Iceland Stock Exchange. Then in December of the same year the company was listed as ICEAIR on the ICEX.

The next year FL Group landed in dire financial straits and then Icelandair Group was hit by the 2008–2012 Icelandic financial crisis. In 2009 Icelandair Group started a financial restructuring, which was successfully completed in February 2011.

On 5 November 2018, Icelandair Group announced that it had made a purchase agreement to acquire all shares of competitor WOW air. The intention was that, after approval of the agreement by shareholders, the two airlines would continue to operate as separate brands. However, the merger was abandoned less than a month later. WOW air then held talks with Indigo Partners; after those talks failed on 21 March 2019, Icelandair Group briefly but unsuccessfully resumed discussions, before WOW air's subsequent cessation of operations on 28 March. Icelandair was one of several airlines to propose special "rescue fares" for stranded WOW air passengers.

Shareholders 

Most of the shareholders of Icelandair Group are pension and investment funds in Iceland. The Pension Fund of Commerce is the biggest shareholder, with 14.36% of shares at the end of 2013. About 22% of the shares are held by small shareholders with less than 0.70% of the shares each.

Subsidiaries 

The subsidiaries of Icelandair Group:

 Icelandair
 Icelandair Cargo

Defunct subsidiaries include:

 Air Iceland Connect
 Loftleidir Icelandic
 VITA

References

External links

Icelandair
Holding companies of Iceland
Airline holding companies
1937 establishments in Iceland
Holding companies established in 1937
Companies based in Reykjavík
Icelandic brands
Airlines established in 1937
Companies listed on Nasdaq Iceland